Aranda de Moncayo is a municipality located in the province of Zaragoza, Aragon, Spain. According to the 2004 census (INE), the municipality has a population of 220 inhabitants. The municipality is home to the 12th-century Castle of Aranda de Moncayo.

References

Municipalities in the Province of Zaragoza